The 1919 Florida Southern Blue and White football team represented Florida Southern College as an independent during the 1919 college football season. Southern upset Florida, 7–0.

Schedule

References

Florida Southern
Florida Southern Moccasins football seasons
College football undefeated seasons
Florida Southern Blue and White football